Rudyard Kipling's The Second Jungle Book: Mowgli & Baloo is a 1997 American adventure film starring Jamie Williams as Mowgli, with Roddy McDowall and Billy Campbell in supporting roles. It is a live action adaptation of Rudyard Kipling's The Jungle Book (loosely based on The Second Jungle Book, as its title would suggest). The film was adapted for the screen by Bayard Johnson and Matthew Horton.

It was shot in Kandy Central Hills, Sri Lanka in July to September 1996 and features some well known Sri Lankan actors like Wijeratne Warakagoda, Sunil Hettiarachchi and Raja Sumanapala.

Plot
10-year-old Mowgli has been raised amongst a wolf pack as well as Baloo the bear and Bagheera the panther in the Jungles of India. Mowgli is the target of the notorious bandar-log (monkey people) who frequently attempt to kidnap him to teach them the ways of man. However, his greatest enemy is Shere Khan the tiger, who killed the boy's father.

Mowgli is soon spotted by an American traveler named Harrison, who wishes to take the man-cub to his circus in America. Mowgli escapes from Harrison and brings along Timo, the pet monkey of Harrison's companion named Chuchundra. Harrison enlists the help of a wealthy man named Buldeo to help him find Mowgli. Buldeo is none other than Mowlgi's paternal uncle - Mowgli is the rightful heir to his father's inheritance. For this reason, Buldeo seeks a snake charmer named Karait who owns Kaa the python, in order to kill Mowgli, pretending to use the snake to simply track the boy.

Mowgli is banished by the wolves for bringing home Timo, who is believed to be a cousin of the bandar-log. Timo is later kidnapped by the bandar-log - Baloo and Mowgli arrive at the Ancient City, the home of the bandar-log to save Timo but Baloo is trapped in the process. Harrison, Buldeo, Karait and Chuchundra successfully capture Mowlgi and bring him to their camp. At night, Shere Khan attacks the camp and Mowgli escapes when fighting him off. However, he is ambushed by Buldeo who attempts to kill him but fails thanks to Harrison's intervention. Baloo escapes from the bandar-log and rescues Mowgli. The two then return to the Ancient City and manage to save Timo whilst encountering King Murphy who wishes to make Mowgli king. The four men arrive at the Ancient City and split up to find Mowgli. Harrison attempts to help Mowgli but is injured by Buldeo who finally reveals his true intentions of wanting to murder his nephew.

Buldeo is confronted by Baloo and Bagheera who arrive to help Mowgli with the wolves. He hides in a canon which is lit by the bandar-log, being sent to the other side of the jungle where he is killed by Shere Khan. Meanwhile, Mowgli is rescued by Harrison and returns Timo to Chuchandra. Harrison offers to take Mowgli back to raise him as his own, having changed his mind about wanting the boy to be living in a circus. Mowgli instead decides to run with the wolves with Harrison and Chuchandra bidding him farewell.

Cast 
 Jamie Williams - Mowgli
 Billy Campbell - Harrison 
 Gulshan Grover - Buldeo 
 David Paul Francis - Chuchundra 
 Dyrk Ashton - Karait 
 Roddy McDowall - King Murphy 
 Cornelia Hayes O'Herlihy - Emily Reece 
 B. J. Hogg - Colonel Reece 
 Amy Robbins - Molly Ward 
 Raja Sumanapala - Buldeo's Servant

Reception
The film mostly received negative reviews from critics. McDowall was nominated for Worst Supporting Actor for this film at the 1997 Stinkers Bad Movie Awards but lost to Jon Voight for Anaconda.

Notes

References

External links
 
 
 

The Jungle Book films
1997 films
1990s adventure films
TriStar Pictures films
Films shot in Sri Lanka
Films set in the 1890s
Jungle adventure films
Films scored by John Scott (composer)
1990s English-language films
Films directed by Dee McLachlan
American adventure films
1990s American films